The following is a list of Chinese musicians:

 Huo Zun, male singer, artist, composer
 Eason Chan, a male singer from Hong Kong
 Wang Leehom, male singer
 Chan Wing-wah, composer
 Chen Jiafeng, [[violinist
 Christopher Loh, singer
 Gao Hong, pipa player and composer
 Ch'eng Mao-yün, violinist and composer
 Jacky Cheung, Cantopop singer
 Leslie Cheung, singer
 Chou Wen-chung, Chinese-born U.S. composer (b. 1923)
 Cui Jian, a rock musician
 Dou Wei, a rock musician
 Du Mingxin, composer
 Fou Ts'ong, pianist
 Shengying Gu, pianist
 Anna Guo, yang-qin player
 Guo Yue, dizi player
 He Yong, rock musician
 Ayi Jihu, singer
 Jin, Chinese American rapper
 Aaron Kwok, Cantopop singer
 Leon Lai, Cantopop singer
 George Lam, Cantopop singer, singer-songwriter, music producer, and actor
 Larissa Lam, Singer, Songwriter
 Sunny Lam, singer-songwriter
 Terence Lam, singer-songwriter
 William Tete Luo, a pianist from Beijing
 Lan Shui, conductor
 Lang Lang, pianist
 Andy Lau, Cantopop singer
 Gigi Leung, Hong Kong Cantopop singer and actress
 Herman Li, guitarist of DragonForce
 Li Yundi, pianist
 Liu Fang, pipa player
 Liu Qi-Chao, jazz musician
 Liu Sola, singer, composer
 Liu Tianhua, composer
 Yang Liu, classical violinist
 Liu Yifei, singer
 Only Won, Chinese American rapper
 Yo-Yo Ma, cellist
 Karen Mok, Hong Kong-based actress and singer-songwriter
 Qu Xiaosong, composer
 Chino Rodriguez, salsa musician, composer, and producer
 Sa Dingding, folk singer/songwriter
 Shen Sinyan, music director and classical composer
 Shenyang, bass-baritone
 Bright Sheng, composer
 Stefanie Sun, Chinese Singaporean singer
 Sun Yingdi, pianist
 Tan Dun, composer
 Melvyn Tan, pianist (fortepiano)
 Muhai Tang, conductor
 Teresa Teng, singer
The8 (Xu Minghao), member of Seventeen
 Tian Zhen
 Twelve Girls Band
 Wang Jian, cellist
 Wang Yuja, pianist
Wen Junhui, member of Seventeen
 Wing Yee, guitarist and singer-songwriter
 Faye Wong, singer
 Di Xiao, Classical Pianist
 Wu Fei, composer, guzheng performer, vocalist
 Xian Xinghai, composer
 Xin Huguang, composer
 Rainie Yang, Taiwanese singer and actress
 Yang Xuefei, guitarist
 Youxin Yang, songwriter
 Ye Xiaogang, composer
 Lai Ying Tong, a songwriter from Hong Kong
 Kris Wu, ex-Exo member
 Lu Han, ex-Exo member
 Huang Zitao, ex-Exo member
 Li Wenhan, UNIQ/UNINE member, soloist
 Lay Zhang, Exo member
 Lai Guanlin, ex-wanna one member
 Xiaojun, NCT member
 Song Yaxuan, Teens in Times member

See also
 Chinese music
 Chinese Music Society of North America (CMSNA)

 Chinese musicians
[[Category: Lists of musicians by nationality